Haplocyon is an extinct genus of terrestrial carnivores belonging to the Carnivoran suborder Caniformia, family Amphicyonidae ("bear dog") named by Schlosser in 1901. It lived in Europe between 28.4 and 23.03 Mya, during the Late Oligocene.

Sources

Miocene mammals of North America
Bear dogs
Miocene carnivorans
Miocene genus extinctions
Prehistoric carnivoran genera